Stephania japonica, known as snake vine, is a vine often seen in sheltered areas near the sea.

Description
A dioecious vine without prickles. Greenish small flowers form on compound umbels, growing from the leaf axils in the warmer months. Inflorescences are 4 to 8 cm long. The fruit is an oval shaped, orange or red drupe, 2 to 5 mm long. A feature of this plant is the peltate leaves, (the stem is attached to the leaf, away from the leaf edge).

Distribution
A widespread vine seen as far south as Eden, New South Wales, north through Queensland. Also seen in Japan, India, Nepal, and many other areas of south-east Asia and the Pacific region. The original specimen was collected in Japan, hence the specific epithet “japonica”. The variety in New South Wales is known as bicolor, as the under-side of the leaf is somewhat paler than above.

Chemistry
Protostephanine is an alkaloid collected from Stephania japonica (Menispermaceae). Antihypertensive agent.

Consumption
The leaves of this plant are commonly used to produce edible green grass jelly in Indonesia.

References

 

japonica
Flora of tropical Asia
Flora of Japan
Flora of New South Wales
Flora of Queensland
Edible plants
Plants described in 1784